Filicin is a chemical compound that has been isolated from ferns of the genus Dryopteris.  It has been isolated from the male fern (Dryopteris filix-mas).  Filicin has been studied for its anthelmintic activity.

Related compounds
Examples of  include:

References

Phenols